The Iron Swordsman is a 1949 Italian historical drama film directed by Riccardo Freda and starring Carlo Ninchi and Gianna Maria Canale. It is loosely based on real life events of Ugolino della Gherardesca.

Plot 
Ugolino della Gherardesca, a gentleman of character but also inclined to sentimental adventures, is disliked by the other powerful Pisan families. Cardinal Ruggieri, who pretends to be his friend, plots a plot against him: held responsible for the defeat of the Meloria against the Republic of Genoa, Ugolino is walled up alive with his sons. Despite being able to unmask the plot, the daughter is unable to avoid the gruesome fate of her relatives.

Cast 
Carlo Ninchi as Count Ugolino della Gherardesca
Gianna Maria Canale as  Emilia
Peter Trent as Cardinal Ruggieri
Piero Palermini as  Balduccio
Carla Calò as  Haidée
Luigi Pavese as Sismondi
Ugo Sasso as Fortebraccio

Release
The Iron Swordsman was released in Italy on November 1, 1949 where it was distributed by Forum Film. It grossed a total of £87 million lire domestically.

References

Footnotes

Sources

External links

1950s historical drama films
Italian historical drama films
Films directed by Riccardo Freda
Italian black-and-white films
Films scored by Alessandro Cicognini
Cultural depictions of Italian men
1950s Italian films
1940s Italian films